Joy to the World is the twenty-sixth solo studio album by American country singer Connie Smith. It was released in October 1975 via Columbia Records and originally contained ten tracks. It was re-released decades later by Real Gone Music to digital sites and featured one new track. The album was Smith's first album of Christmas music.

Background
In the 1970s, Connie Smith moved from RCA Victor to Columbia Records after 18 top ten Billboard country singles. She had discovered Christianity during this period, which prompted Columbia to let her record one gospel album per year. Despite the contract terms, the only gospel collection released was 1973's God Is Abundant. No gospel collection was issued by Columbia in 1974 due to the label's lack of interest and Smith's unexpected time devoted to her pregnancy. Columbia instead issued two gospel albums of Smith's material in 1975, beginning in May with Connie Smith Sings Hank Williams Gospel. It would be followed by her first Christmas album, which would be titled Joy to the World.

Smith had wanted to record a religious set of Christmas material for several years. In her initial contract with Columbia, executive Clive Davis noted that Smith would have the opportunity record one Christmas collection. According to biographer Barry Mazor, Smith "was not pressured" into cutting pop Christmas tunes. "I wanted a real Christmas album, about the real Christmas. And I wanted the old songs," Smith said. "I can't say I did this for mama, but I knew she would love it!"

Recording and content
Smith recorded Joy to the World one year prior to the album's release. The album was cut over three sessions at Columbia Studio B, located in Nashville, Tennessee: August 20, August 21 and August 22, 1974. All three sessions were produced by Ray Baker, whom had recorded Smith's previous three studio albums at Columbia. Three overdub sessions were also added, however, production credits were unknown, according to biographer Barry Mazor. Most of the project's material was dated and in the public domain. Therefore, Smith was credited as an arranger for most of the project's tracks. 

A total of ten tracks comprised the original collection. As with previous albums, Smith chose the music. Among the tracks handpicked by her was "O Holy Night" and "What Child Is This?". "There are no better Christmas songs than 'O Holy Night' or 'What Child Is This'," she told Barry Mazor. Another chosen track was "Sweet Little Jesus Boy", which was notably done by gospel performer, Mahalia Jackson. "I wanted to do that one because I was a huge fan of hers, and that she'd done it impressed me so much," recalled Smith in 2021. She initially wanted to record "Little Drummer Boy" in the ballad style of a similar version cut by Ray Price. However, Smith was pressured into making an up-tempo version of the track. "I wound up doing what they [Columbia] wanted, but I've always regretted that I didn't cut it more my way," she told Mazor. A duet version of "Silent Night, Holy Night" was added to the 2017 re-release of Joy to the World. The duet version included Willie Nelson and was first issued on a Christmas compilation in 1986.

Release and reception
Joy to the World was originally released by Columbia Records in October 1975. It was originally distributed as a vinyl LP, containing five songs on either side of the record. It was the twenty eighth studio album of Smith's career and her sixth with Columbia. Upon its initial release, the album attracted little commercial attention. According to biographer Barry Mazor, the album "did not see much circulation either". Smith later theorized, "I don't think they even released it everywhere, and it became one of the rarest ones to find." The only known promotion was done by Billboard, which featured an advertisement of the album and announced its release under the headline of "New LP/Tape Releases". The album was re-released by Real Gone Music on November 3, 2017 as both a compact disc and in a digital format. It was the first Columbia album of Smith's music to be re-released.

Track listings

Vinyl version

Compact disc and digital versions

Personnel
All credits are adapted from the liner notes of Joy to the World and the biography booklet by Barry Mazor titled The Latest Shade of Blue.

Musical personnel
 Tommy Allsup – Guitar
 Carol Lee Cooper – Organ
 Ray Edenton – Rhythm guitar
 Lloyd Green – Steel guitar
 Shayne Keister – Synthesizer, vibes
 Kenny Malone – Drums
 Grady Martin – Guitar
 Bob Moore – Electric bass
 Hargus "Pig" Robbins – Piano
 Connie Smith – Lead vocals
 Chip Young – Guitar, leader

Technical personnel
 Ray Baker – Percussion, producer
 Carol Lee Cooper – Arranger
 Connie Smith – Arranger

Release history

References

Footnotes

Books

 

1975 Christmas albums
Albums produced by Ray Baker (music producer)
Christmas albums by American artists
Connie Smith albums
Columbia Records Christmas albums
Country Christmas albums